Andrey Dementyev or Andrei Dementiev may refer to:

 Andrey Dementyev (poet) (1928–2018), Russian poet
 Andrey Dementyev (footballer) (born 1970), Russian footballer